Out of the Blue is a 2006 New Zealand crime drama film directed by Robert Sarkies and starring Karl Urban. The film premiered at Toronto International Film Festival in Canada and was released in New Zealand on 12 October 2006. The film grossed over $1 million at the New Zealand box-office, taking it into the top ten highest grossing local films.

The film is based on the Aramoana massacre, the deadliest mass shooting in New Zealand prior to the Christchurch mosque shootings, that occurred over a period of two days in the small coastal community of Aramoana in Otago, New Zealand.

Plot
On 13 November 1990, David Gray, an unemployed man in his 30s lives in his parents' small holiday home in Aramoana. He cycles into town where he has an argument with staff at a bank over a minor issue. Unstable and angry, he returns home where he has a cache of fire-arms, including a semi-automatic rifle. 
Late in the afternoon, he notices children from a neighbouring house have wandered onto his yard and he angrily abuses them, sparking a heated verbal exchange with their father, Garry Holden. Gray goes inside his house and then quickly re-emerges armed with the rifle, shooting Holden dead. 
Holden's two young daughters, Chiquita and Jasmine, and his girlfriend Julie-Anne's adopted daughter Rewa, witness the murder and flee inside Holden's house, attempting to hide. Gray enters and soon locates them.

Chiquita is then seen fleeing, having been wounded, trying to get help for Jasmine and Rewa (whose deaths occur off-screen). She reaches Julie-Anne and they both get into her van and drive towards the scene, trying to rescue the other girls, only to find Holden's house has been set on fire. Julie-Anne is then forced to drive to safety as Gray fires at her vehicle.

Nearby residents hear the shooting and see the smoke, not yet comprehending what is happening. Gray enters a nearby house and shoots dead both elderly male occupants (their deaths occur off-screen).

Elderly widow Eva Dickson, who recently has had hip surgery, ventures out with her walking frame to see what is happening and she is joined by a neighbour Chris Cole. Earlier, Dickson's middle-aged son James had left the house, looking for his dog. An unseen Gray opens fire, hitting Cole and narrowly missing Dickson. Having collapsed and unable to stand up again, Dickson crawls inside her house to ring the police and then goes back to Cole, lying badly wounded but still conscious, to tell him that help is coming (Cole later succumbs to his injuries).

A utility with six people on board, including three children, drives up from the nearby beach, stopping near the burning house. Gray emerges and opens fire. The subsequent shootings are not shown, only the noise and the look of horror on the face of a nearby witness.
 
It is now getting dark and the Holden house is engulfed in flames. The first police to arrive are Sgt Stewart Guthrie, Constable Nick Harvey and Detective Paul Knox. They arrive at Gray's and Holden's houses, seeing bodies in and around the utility, including a woman on the ground who is badly wounded and calling for help. The police attempt to surround Gray's house but the gunman surprises Guthrie from behind, shooting him dead. Harvey, armed with a rifle, briefly has Gray in his sights but hesitates, missing his chance. 
Knox reaches the utility, discovering the woman is now dead but one of the vehicle's other occupants still alive- 3-year-old Stacey Percy, who has been wounded in the abdomen but is still conscious. Knox and Harvey enter Gray's house but find it empty. They get into a car, Harvey nursing Stacey, trying to keep her conscious and Knox holding the bodies of the other two children from the utility, and drive to where a police cordon is being established, handing Stacey over to paramedics. Harvey is physically ill as he reacts to the fear and trauma.

Eva Dickson stays in her kitchen, keeping in touch with police by phone. Her dog comes back, stained with the blood of her son James (whose death has occurred off-screen). The police seal off the town, residents spending a fearful night in their homes with the gunman still at large. Gray enters a crib and, finding it deserted, spends the night there.

The next day, police have arrived en masse and are combing the town, searching for Gray. Armed Offenders Squad (AOS) officers locate the crib and surround the small house. After a brief exchange of gunfire, the officers throw tear-gas canisters into the house. Gray abruptly emerges, screaming obscenities and firing wildly from the hip. The waiting officers open fire and hit Gray several times, the gunman collapsing. With difficulty, the AOS men restrain him and then wait nearby as Gray dies of his wounds.

A postscript follows, consisting of a montage of scenes, including the full squad of AOS officers escorting Eva Dickson from her home as a mark of respect for her bravery, Chiquita Holden and Stacey Percy in hospital, both recovering from their wounds, the deliberate torching of Gray's house that occurred several days after the massacre and a list of names of the 13 people who died on 13 November.

Cast 
 Karl Urban as Nick Harvey
 Matthew Sunderland as David Gray
 Lois Lawn as Eva Helen Dickson
 Simon Ferry as Garry Holden
 Tandi Wright as Julie-Anne Bryson
 Paul Glover as Paul Knox
 William Kircher as Sergeant Stu Guthrie
 Georgia Fabish as Chiquita Holden
 Fayth Rasmussen as Stacey Percy

Reception 
The film received positive reviews and had a Rotten Tomatoes score of 84% as of August 2022. Production of the film faced a lot of opposition from the town, and as a result no filming was done in Aramoana. Some members of the community were against the movie being filmed, but they would get to see the movie first before it was released to the public, and it would not be called 'Aramoana.' Most of the filming was shot in Long Beach, a settlement six kilometres from Aramoana.

The Office of Film and Literature Classification has classified the film Out of the Blue as R15 (restricted to viewers under 15 years of age) with the descriptive note "violence and content that may disturb".  The film was restricted because the murders it depicts are likely to cause younger viewers distress and threaten their sense of personal safety.  "Out of the Blue deals with recent events involving real people.  For that reason we consulted with the families of victims and the Aramoana community.  We were impressed by the articulate and heartfelt comments they made at our meetings" said Chief Censor Bill Hastings.

The film deals with violence in a realistic but restrained way.  The effect the film has on its audience is likely to depend on the circumstances of the viewer.  Mr Hastings said "for some of those closely involved in the events it portrays the film may be upsetting and traumatic.  Other people may view it as a sensitive portrayal of the responses of ordinary people to horrific events."

One of the AOS officers who located and shot Gray, Mike Kyne, took exception to the way they were portrayed in the film as standing to one side and smoking cigarettes whilst a hand-cuffed Gray lay on the ground, dying of his injuries. Kyne said, 'That's bullshit. Poetic licence.' In reality, none of the AOS officers had smoked at the scene. Kyne pointed out that to have done so would have been highly unprofessional. After restraining Gray, they had called an ambulance. (Unlike the scene in the film, Gray did not die outside the crib but later in the ambulance en route to hospital.) Also, in the exchange of gunfire prior to Gray's capture, one of the AOS members was shot in the buttocks, which is not seen in the film.

References

External links 
 
 
 Out of the Blue: The Aramoana Tragedy An interview with Robert Sarkies
 "How We May Still Be Redeemed: Nostalgia and the Sublimation of Realism in 'Out of the Blue,'" an essay by Alexander Greenhough, published in Metro 163 (December 2009) pp 108–11
  NZFC profile

2006 crime drama films
2006 films
Films set in 1990
New Zealand crime drama films
Crime films based on actual events
2000s English-language films
2000s New Zealand films